Kyung-min, also spelled Kyoung-min, Gyeong-min, or Kyong-min, is a Korean unisex given name. Its meaning differs based on the hanja used to write each syllable of the name. There are 54 hanja with the reading "kyung" and 27 hanja with the reading "min" on the South Korean government's official list of hanja which may be used in given names.

People with this name include:
Shin Gyeong-min (신경민, born 1953), South Korean male politician with the Democratic United Party
Hong Kyung-min (born Hong Seong-min, 1976), South Korean male pop-rock singer and actor
Ra Kyung-min (born 1976), South Korean female badminton player
Yoon Kyung-min (born 1979), South Korean male handball player
Ko Kyung-min (born 1987), South Korean male football player
Hur Kyoung-min (born 1990), South Korean male baseball player
Park Kyung-min (born 1990), South Korean male football player
Ri Kyong-min, North Korean male football player who scored a goal during the 2000 AFC Asian Cup qualification

See also
List of Korean given names

References

Korean unisex given names